The William R. Kirby Sr. House (also known as the Kirby–Keefer House) is a private house located at 377 State Road in Hillsdale, Michigan. It was designated a Michigan State Historic Site in 1979 and listed on the National Register of Historic Places in 1982. It is one of the few early cobblestone houses extant in Michigan.

History
William Kirby Sr. was born near Leeds, England in 1805. He married Hannah Sykes, and the couple emigrated to the United States in 1827. After living in New York and Ohio, in 1835 they moved to Hillsdale County to homestead, one of the first families to settle in the area. In the 1840s, William and Hannah constructed this house. It took three years to gather the cobbles used in construction. Hannah Kirby died in 1876 and William in 1888, by which time their homestead had grown to 240 acres. The house was eventually passed on to William Kirby Jr.

The house was later owned by Robert Keefer.

Description
The Kirby House is a two-story Greek Revival with a gable roof and single story additions on the side and rear. The house is constructed of fieldstone faced with parallel rows of cobblestones, with cut sandstone quoins, lintels, and sills.

Images

References

Houses on the National Register of Historic Places in Michigan
Greek Revival houses in Michigan
Houses completed in 1845
Houses in Hillsdale County, Michigan
Michigan State Historic Sites
Hillsdale, Michigan
National Register of Historic Places in Hillsdale County, Michigan